The 1997–98 season was the 97th season in Athletic Bilbao's history and their 67th consecutive season in La Liga, the top division of Spanish football.

Season summary

The previous season, Luis Fernández's first as head coach, was a successful one for Athletic, as their 6th-place finish in La Liga gained them a place in the 1997–98 UEFA Cup first round after a two-year exile from European competition. The Frenchman's second La Liga campaign yielded even greater success: Bilbao finished as runners-up, behind only Barcelona, and qualified for the 1998–99 UEFA Champions League. This was their highest league finish, and first qualification for Europe's premier competition, since their last La Liga triumph in 1984.

They also had a good run in the Copa del Rey, reaching the quarterfinals for the first time since 1994–95. They were eliminated on away goals by eventual runners-up Mallorca.

Athletic's UEFA Cup first round opponents were Sampdoria of Italy. The Spaniards took a valuable 2–1 win in the first leg in Genoa, and secured passage to the second round with a 2–0 victory at San Mamés. Their reward was a second round tie against Aston Villa of England, with the first leg in Bilbao finishing goalless. The Birmingham side took a 2–0 lead just after half time at Villa Park, and a late goal from Javi González was not enough to prevent Athletic's elimination.

Squad statistics

Appearances and goals

|}
1. Tabuenka was transferred to SD Compostela during the season.

Results

La Liga

League table

UEFA Cup

First round

Athletic Bilbao won 4–1 on aggregate

Second round

Aston Villa won 2–1 on aggregate

See also
1997–98 La Liga
1997–98 Copa del Rey
1997–98 UEFA Cup

External links

References

Athletic Bilbao
Athletic Bilbao seasons